Kasak Rahay Ge  is a 2018 Pakistani television series directed by Furqan T. Siddiqui, produced by Zeekay Films and written by Seema Munaf. It stars Noor Hassan Rizvi as Daniyal, Sakina Samo as Nasira Begum, Zainab Ahmed as Rabiya, Faizan Khawaja as Fasih and Adla Khan as Emaan. The drama was first aired on 26 October 2018 on TVOne Pakistan.

Plot 
Daniyal Married to Rabiya but desires Eman. But Eman Marries Fasih.A Battle of Selfish Desires with face selfless flow.

Cast 
 Noor Hassan Rizvi as Daniyal 
 Sakina Samo as Nasira Begum 
 Zainab Ahmed as Rabiya
 Faizan Khawaja as Fasih  
 Adla Khan as Emaan

References

External links 

 Website

2018 Pakistani television series debuts
TVOne Pakistan
Pakistani drama television series
Urdu-language television shows